The Man In Black-His Greatest Hits is a compilation album released on Columbia Records in 1999. It is a two disc set including 30 songs (15 on each disc). Even though it was released on the Columbia label, it does contain some of his Sun recordings, which were allowed to fall in the Public Domain, as well as his Columbia recordings.

Track listing

Charts
Album - Billboard (United States)

References

1999 compilation albums
Johnny Cash compilation albums
Columbia Records compilation albums